Amy Hill Hearth (pronounced "Harth", born 1958) is an American journalist and author who specializes in stories about women. She is the author or co-author of eight nonfiction books, including the oral history Having Our Say: The Delany Sisters' First 100 Years, a New York Times bestseller for 113 weeks, according to its archives.

Departing from her non-fiction work, Hearth wrote her first novel, Miss Dreamsville and the Collier County Women's Literary Society, in 2011. It was published on October 2, 2012.

Hearth's most recent book, published January 2, 2018, is Streetcar to Justice: How Elizabeth Jennings Won the Right to Ride in New York. Written for middle-grade to adult readers, and published by HarperCollins/Greenwillow Books, the book is the first biography of civil rights pioneer Elizabeth Jennings Graham.

Life and career

Amy Hearth spent her childhood in Columbia, South Carolina, and her young adult years in Florida.

She is a thirteenth-generation American whose ancestors fought for independence in the Revolutionary War. She has some Native American (Lenni-Lenape) ancestry as well, and was given the Native name "Smiling Songbird Woman" by the Nanticoke Lenni-Lenape Indians in a tribal ceremony in 2010 in honor of her oral history about their tribal matriarch, Strong Medicine Speaks: A Native American Elder Has Her Say.

She attended the University of Massachusetts at Amherst, majoring in Sociology, then transferred to the University of Tampa, Florida editing the college newspaper and earning a B.A. in Writing. Her first newspaper job was assistant arts and entertainment editor at The Berkshire Eagle in Pittsfield, Massachusetts, and her first full-time reporting job was at the Daytona Beach News-Journal in Florida. She met her future husband, a native of Naples, Florida, when she interviewed him for a story. Hearth relocated to the New York area, and subsequently wrote eighty-eight bylined news and feature stories for The New York Times. This included her article on the Delany Sisters, "Two Maiden Ladies with Stories to Tell".

Hearth is a college lecturer. In January 2012, for example, she was a visiting author at the University of Tampa, her alma mater. She and author Michael Connelly appeared together at what was billed by the university as its "Official Opening Reading" of the university's newly launched Master of Fine Arts in Creative Writing program.

She and her husband live in the greater New York area.

Having Our Say
Among Hearth's New York Times stories was a September 22, 1991, feature on a then-unknown pair of a centenarian sisters, Sadie Delany and Bessie Delany, with the headline, "Two 'Maiden Ladies' With Century-Old Stories to Tell".

In an interview in the October–November 2007 issue of Book Women magazine, Hearth said that her interest in telling people's stories was the reason she tracked down the reclusive Delany sisters and asked for an interview. When she finally met them, they were reluctant to be interviewed. In a New York Times story published on April 2, 1995, she recalled: They didn't think they were important enough. I had to convince them and gave this little impromptu speech - that I thought it was very important that people from their generation be represented, especially black women who hadn't had much opportunity. I guess my enthusiasm rubbed off.

Following the article's publication, Hearth was asked by Kodansha America, a book publisher, to expand it into a full-length biography.  She decided, instead, to create an oral history and worked with the Delany sisters for almost two years to gather material for the book. 
The book was published in 1993. It became a New York Times Bestseller for 113 weeks and was also on the bestseller lists of The Washington Post, The Los Angeles Times, USA Today and Publishers Weekly.

Reflecting on her early career as a journalist, she said: "I did the hard stuff. I've been in a police car going 130 miles per hour chasing someone...but I always loved finding a feature where I could really get into someone's life story."

The Dallas Morning News, in its review of Having Our Say, wrote that Hearth: "worked carefully to preserve the speech patterns and personalities of each sister in the text so the stories unfold as complementary harmonies of the same melody.

With Hearth's contributions—she was credited as an advisor and production consultant—the books were adapted to the Broadway stage in 1995 and for film in 1999. The film version features the actress Amy Madigan playing the role of Hearth. For her work on the film, Hearth received a George Foster Peabody Award for Excellence in Broadcasting.

Hearth was one of two authors whose work was the subject of extensive analysis in the academic book Women Co-Authors. Author Holly A. Larid notes that the tone of Having Our Say is set when "Hearth writes in her preface, 'Their story, as the Delany sisters like to say, is not meant as "black" history or "women's" history but American history.'"

Other works
In the 2009 Contemporary Authors feature on Hearth's career, she explained her writing process: To me, the first step in the creation of an oral history is developing a relationship of trust with my subject. Then it is a matter of complete immersion in my subject's world, listening with an almost otherworldly intensity, asking the perfect questions, and being extremely sensitive to the nuances of what the person is telling me. While it goes without saying that I do scrupulous research and fact-checking for each project, what makes my books special, I think, is that I have an ear for capturing the authentic voice of my subject. It was also noted in this feature that: "she had produced a number of other books and projects as a result of Having Our Say, but she has not limited herself to one story." Among her other works is  'Strong Medicine' Speaks : A Native American Elder Has Her Say: An Oral History, in which "Hearth delves into a different cultural experience".

A review of ′Strong Medicine′ Speaks by Publishers Weekly on January 31, 2008, described the way in which she crafts oral history: "Hearth works almost invisibly to craft a graceful, sustained look into the quiet struggles of contemporary Native Americans."

However, Hearth's oral history books also feature passages written in her own voice that are intended to provide historical and cultural context. A Kirkus Reviews review on December 15, 2007, of ′Strong Medicine′ Speaks referred specifically to these contextual passages written by Hearth: "As Hearth describes it, life [among the Native Americans] in Bridgeton, N.J., seems reminiscent of the rural idyll Thornton Wilder painted in Our Town."

An essay by Hearth on the Delany Sisters was commissioned for inclusion in the anthology, North Carolina Women: Their Lives and Times (Fall 2012, University of Georgia Press).

Her first work of fiction, Miss Dreamsville and the Collier County Women's Literary Society: A Novel was published by Atria Books/Simon & Schuster, in October 2012. Its sequel, Miss Dreamsville and the Lost Heiress of Collier County followed in September 2015.

Bibliography

References

External links

1958 births
Living people
21st-century American novelists
American feminist writers
American women novelists
21st-century American women writers
20th-century American journalists
20th-century American historians
20th-century American women writers
American women historians
21st-century American historians
Writers from Columbia, South Carolina
University of Massachusetts Amherst College of Social and Behavioral Sciences alumni
University of Tampa alumni
The New York Times writers
Novelists from New York (state)
Novelists from South Carolina